Albert Joseph McConnell (1903 – 1993) was an Irish mathematician and mathematical physicist whose career was entirely spent at Trinity College Dublin (TCD), where he also served as Provost.

He was born in Ballymena, County Antrim, and studied Mathematics and Philosophy at TCD, graduating BA in 1926. He carried out his postgraduate studies in the Sapienza University of Rome under the direction of Tullio Levi-Civita and was awarded his doctorate there in 1928. That same year, he was the official Irish delegate to the International Congress of Mathematicians in Bologna, where he gave an invited address on "The Torsion of Riemannian Space"

Returning to Trinity, he was appointed Professor of Natural Philosophy (Physics) and was elected Fellow in 1930. He specialized in tensor calculus, and published the book Applications of the Absolute Differential Calculus in 1931. He later co-edited The Mathematical Papers of Sir William Rowan Hamilton: Volume 2, Dynamics (1940).

He was appointed Provost in 1952 and served for 22 years until his retirement in 1974. During his tenure he reformed the structures of Trinity, allowing more junior academics hold offices such as Bursar, Senior Lecturer and Registrar. He also oversaw the reform allowing women to be elected as Fellows and Scholars of Trinity and to be entitled to reside on campus. Finally, he was the last Provost to be elected for life, his retirement was therefore voluntary and opened the way to the first  election of a Provost to serve for a limited term of ten years, as is the case for all subsequent Provosts.

On his retirement he was appointed to the Council of State.

Books
 1940 The Mathematical Papers of Sir William Rowan Hamilton: Volume 2, Dynamics,  Cambridge, (co-edited with A. W. Conway)
 1931 Applications of the Absolute Differential Calculus, Blackie & Son, reprinted by Dover in 1947 as Applications of Tensor Analysis

References

External links
 
Biography from Trinity College, Dublin
Biography from Dictionary of Irish Biography

1903 births
1993 deaths
Academics of Trinity College Dublin
Alumni of Trinity College Dublin
20th-century Irish mathematicians
People from Ballymena
Presidential appointees to the Council of State (Ireland)
Provosts of Trinity College Dublin
Sapienza University of Rome alumni